High may refer to:

Science and technology 
 Height
 High (atmospheric), a high-pressure area
 High (computability), a quality of a Turing degree, in computability theory
 High (tectonics), in geology an area where relative tectonic uplift took or takes place
 Substance intoxication, also known by the slang description "being high"
 Sugar high, a misconception about the supposed psychological effects of sucrose

Music

Performers
 High (musical group), a 1974–1990 Indian rock group
 The High, an English rock band formed in 1989

Albums
 High (The Blue Nile album) or the title song, 2004
 High (Flotsam and Jetsam album), 1997
 High (New Model Army album) or the title song, 2007
 High (Royal Headache album) or the title song, 2015
 High (EP), by Jarryd James, or the title song, 2016

Songs
 "High" (Alison Wonderland song), 2018
 "High" (The Chainsmokers song), 2022
 "High" (The Cure song), 1992
 "High" (David Hallyday song), 1988
 "High" (Feeder song), 1997
 "High" (James Blunt song), 2004
 "High" (Knut Anders Sørum song), 2004 
 "High" (Lighthouse Family song), 1997
 "High" (Peking Duk song), 2014
  "High" (Sir Sly song), 2017
 "High" (Young Rising Sons song), 2014
 "High", by 5 Seconds of Summer from Calm, 2020
 "High", by Alaska Thunderfuck from Poundcake, 2016
 "High", by Corinne Bailey Rae from The Heart Speaks in Whispers, 2016
 "High", by Kool Savas, Samra, and Sido, 2019
 "High", by Ledisi from Let Love Rule, 2017
 "High", by Little Dragon from Season High, 2017
 "High", by María Becerra, 2019
 "High", by Miley Cyrus from Plastic Hearts, 2020
 "High", by Parokya ni Edgar from Buruguduystunstugudunstuy, 1997
 "High", by Prince from The Chocolate Invasion, 2004
 "High", by Stabbing Westward from Stabbing Westward, 2001
 "High", by Wethan and Dua Lipa from the Fifty Shades Freed film soundtrack, 2018
 "High", by Young Thug from On the Rvn, 2018
 "High", by Zella Day from Kicker, 2015
 "High (Interlude)", by Lupe Fiasco from Drogas Light, 2017

Other uses
 High (film), a 1967 Canadian film 
 High (play), a 2011 play by Matthew Lombardo
 High (surname)
 High (technical analysis), or top, an event in market-price fluctuations of a security
 High, Just-As-High, and Third, in Norse mythology, three figures in the Prose Edda
 Secondary school or high school, frequently referred to as either "junior high" or "senior high"

See also
 
 HI (disambiguation)
 High Road (disambiguation)
 High Street (disambiguation)
 Higher (disambiguation)
 HY (disambiguation)
 Lists of highest points